Ostrowite  is a village in the administrative district of Gmina Brzuze, within Rypin County, Kuyavian-Pomeranian Voivodeship, in north-central Poland.

The village has a population of 1,300.

References

Ostrowite